is a Japanese light novel series written by Akira Aihara and illustrated by Chisato Kobayashi. The series began publishing on May 9, 2020 by ASCII Media Works under the Dengeki Bunko publishing imprint.

Plot 
A slit romantic comedy that is pressed by a real and hated beautiful girl in class!

Masumi Kanbe, an elite high school student who works hard day and night to become the Cabinet Secretary. In order to save Mika Negoto, a beautiful girl who refuses to go to school, he logs into the "devil's VR online game" where she is - but she dislikes him by telling the "truth"! ID was also blocked, and he had no choice but to enter with another red card... "Lady Munchkin, that's a big deal! Too precious, I died three times!" The cousin's account that he used without permission belongs to the popular commentator that Negoto enthusiastically adores! Then it will be easier. Hide his true identity and direct him to a clean and righteous path instead of impure actions with Negoto!

Characters 
 
The text on the right is "Not late, not absent." His dream for the future is Chief Cabinet Secretary. He tries to solve the problem of Mika Negoto's school refusal because of a personal statement.

 
Masumi's classmate and beautiful S-class girl. She suddenly stops coming to school, even though she is friendly and has no behavior problems.

 
Cousin who lives next door to Masumi. She is a sophomore in middle school with god-level playing techniques.

Media

Light novels 
This light novel is written by Akira Aihara and illustrated by Chisato Kobayashi. ASCII Media Works has published a single volume since May 2020 under their Dengeki Bunko imprint.

References

External links 
  

Light novels
2020 Japanese novels
Dengeki Bunko